Reputasyon is a Philippine romance drama previously aired by ABS-CBN. It stars Cristine Reyes together with Rayver Cruz and Jason Abalos. It also stars the daytime television comeback of Aiko Melendez and Jaclyn Jose. It originally aired on the 2:00-2:45 p.m. timeslot, until September 19, 2011 when it was moved to the 5:00-5:45 p.m. timeslot as requested by the televiewers. The show was aired from July 11, 2011 to January 20, 2012, and was replaced by Precious Hearts Romances Presents: Lumayo Ka Man Sa Akin.

Premise
Can one false accusation ruin a person's whole life? The story of Reputasyon begins with the idyllic life of Agnes de los Santos, whose family is respected by everyone in the small town of San Lucas.  She dreams of becoming a teacher just like her mom and raising a family of her own with the man she loves. But her world shatters when her unexpected visit to their beloved governor's home turns into a huge scandal in their town. How can she prove that she's not there for a midnight tryst? Will anyone believe her innocence? What happens once she discovers that she's merely used to cover up a much greater crime?

Cast and characters

Main cast
Cristine Reyes as Agnes delos Santos - An obedient daughter to her parents, Agnes values the pride and integrity of her family in their town. She doesn't ask for much out of life except to finish her studies and be a teacher one day. But her life will head a turn for the worse when she's falsely accused as their town governor's mistress. 
Rayver Cruz as Henry Aragon - A man with a mysterious past, Henry will cross paths with Agnes at a most inopportune time. Although they would dislike each other at first, Henry is the only person who'll stand by Agnes when she's forced to leave her hometown out of shame. 
Jason Abalos as Boyet Mangubat - Boyet's childhood crush towards Agnes has turned into real love when they grew up. But he respects her decision to finish her studies first before entering a serious relationship.
Aiko Melendez as Catherine Espeleta-Villamayor / Connie Aragon - Bernard's widowed wife and Henry's older sister. She accuses Agnes for having affair with her husband.

Supporting cast
Jaclyn Jose as Luisa Alcantara-delos Santos
Lito Pimentel as Jose delos Santos
Jill Yulo as Niña delos Santos 
Laurice Guillen as Concordia Villamayor
John James Uy as Randy Villamayor
Andrei Garcia as Jun-Jun delos Santos
Deborah Sun as Mindy Alcantara
Bing Davao as Daniel Villamayor

Extended cast
RR Enriquez as Monica
Cherry Lou as Tina Dominguez
Gino Paul Guzman as Miguel Jacinto
Nico Antonio as Jaycee
Zeppi Borromeo as Boy George
Mara Lopez as Shiela
Alex Castro as Manuel
Shey Bustamante as Tricia
Gem Ramos as Lily
Arran Sese as Felix 
Savannah Lamsen as Camille
Daphne Cortez as Myra
Noel Colet as Boss Soriano
Simon Ibarra as Itoy
Erika Padilla as Precious
Carlos Morales as Antonio Marasigan
Arnold Reyes as Atty. Victor Sta. Maria
Che Ramos as Lani Sta. Maria
Elaine Quemuel as Mercy Rivera
Manuel Chua as Marco Olivar
Sunshine Garcia as Mica Gutierrez
Paolo Serrano as Julius

Special participation
Celso Ad. Castillo as Samuel Aragon
Emilio Garcia as Gov. Bernard Villamayor
Jane Oineza as Young Catherine Villamayor
Kristel Moreno as Catherine (young adult)
Kevin Viard as potential investor
CJ Navato as Teen Henry
Calvin Joseph Cajo Gomez as Young Henry

Episodes

Reception

Broadcast
Reputasyon is not available in selected ABS-CBN Regional channels due to local version of TV Patrol on the same time slot. Instead they replay or taped broadcast the following day after the yesterdays episode, either morning or afternoon time slot pre-empty Anime or Korean programs.

See also
List of programs broadcast by ABS-CBN
List of ABS-CBN drama series

References

External links

ABS-CBN drama series
2011 Philippine television series debuts
2012 Philippine television series endings
Philippine crime television series
Political thriller television series
Thriller television series
Philippine political television series
Philippine romance television series
Filipino-language television shows
Television series by Star Creatives
Television shows set in the Philippines